The episode list for the NBC series, Mad About You. In total, there were 176 episodes broadcast over eight seasons.

Series overview

Episodes

Season 1 (1992–93)

Season 2 (1993–94)

Season 3 (1994–95)

Season 4 (1995–96)
Filming of Season 4 was delayed to allow Helen Hunt to complete work on the film Twister (1996) which was running behind schedule.

Season 5 (1996–97)

Season 6 (1997–98)

Season 7 (1998–99)

Season 8 (2019)
On September 5, 2019, it was announced that the first six episodes of the revival would premiere on November 20, 2019, and another six episodes will be released on December 18, 2019.

References

External links
Epguides.com Mad About You
Tv.com Episode guide

Mad About You

it:Episodi di Innamorati pazzi (prima stagione)